Ait Izzou (Arabic: ايت إيزو) is a small town in the Moroccan region of Drâa-Tafilalet.

Born in Ait Izzou 
Adam Maher (1993), Dutch-Moroccan football player

References

Populated places in Drâa-Tafilalet